A Wrinkle in Time is a young adult science fantasy novel written by American author Madeleine L'Engle. First published in 1962, the book won the Newbery Medal, the Sequoyah Book Award, the Lewis Carroll Shelf Award, and was runner-up for the Hans Christian Andersen Award. The main characters – Meg Murry, Charles Wallace Murry, and Calvin O'Keefe – embark on a journey through space and time, from galaxy to galaxy, as they endeavor to rescue the Murrys' father and fight back The Black Thing that has intruded into several worlds.

The novel offers a glimpse into the war between light and darkness, and good and evil, as the young characters mature into adolescents on their journey. The novel wrestles with questions of spirituality and purpose, as the characters are often thrown into conflicts of love, divinity, and goodness. It is the first book in L'Engle's Time Quintet, which follows the Murry family and O'Keefe.

L'Engle modeled the Murry family on her own. B.E. Cullinan noted that L'Engle created characters who "share common joy with a mixed fantasy and science fiction setting". The novel's scientific and religious undertones are therefore highly reflective of the life of L'Engle.

The book has inspired a 2003 television film directed by John Kent Harrison, and a 2018 theatrical film directed by Ava DuVernay, both produced by The Walt Disney Company.

Background 

Raised in the Upper East Side of Manhattan, author Madeleine L'Engle began writing at a young age. After graduating from boarding school in Switzerland, she attended Smith College, where she earned a degree in English. In addition to writing, L'Engle also gained experience as an actor and playwright. At age forty, she nearly abandoned her career as a novelist, but continued to write after her publication of Meet the Austins.

L'Engle wrote A Wrinkle in Time between 1959 and 1960. In her memoir, L'Engle explains that the book was conceived "during a time of transition". After years of living in rural Goshen, Connecticut where they ran a general store, L'Engle's family, the Franklins, moved back to New York City, first taking a ten-week camping trip across the country. L'Engle writes that "we drove through a world of deserts and buttes and leafless mountains, wholly new and alien to me. And suddenly into my mind came the names, Mrs Whatsit. Mrs Who. Mrs Which." This was in the spring of 1959. When asked for more information in an interview with Horn Book magazine in 1983, L'Engle responded

L'Engle has also described the novel as her "psalm of praise to life, [her] stand for life against death."

Additionally, L'Engle drew upon her interest in science. The novel includes references to Einstein's theory of relativity and Planck's quantum theory.

A Wrinkle in Time is the first novel in the Time Quintet, a series of five young-adult novels by L'Engle.  Later books include A Wind in the Door, A Swiftly Tilting Planet, Many Waters, and An Acceptable Time. The series follows the adventures of Meg Murry, her youngest brother Charles Wallace Murry, their friend Calvin O'Keefe, and her twin siblings Sandy and Dennys Murry. Throughout the series, family members band together to travel through time as they attempt to save the world from the grasps of evil.

Publication history
Upon completion in 1960, the novel was rejected by at least 26 publishers, because it was, in L'Engle's words, "too different," and "because it deals overtly with the problem of evil, and it was really difficult for children, and was it a children's or an adults' book, anyhow?"

In "A special message from Madeleine L'Engle", L'Engle offers another possible reason for the rejections: "A Wrinkle in Time had a female protagonist in a science fiction book", which at the time was rare.

After trying "forty-odd" publishers (L'Engle later said "twenty-six rejections"), L'Engle's agent returned the manuscript to her. Then at Christmas, L'Engle threw a tea party for her mother. One of the guests happened to know J.C. Farrar of Farrar, Straus and Giroux, and he insisted that L'Engle should meet with him. Although the publisher did not, at the time, publish a line of children's books, Farrar met L'Engle, liked the novel, and ultimately published it under the Ariel imprint.

In 1963, the book won the Newbery Medal, an annual award given by the Association for Library Service to Children, a division of the American Library Association, to the author of the most distinguished contribution to American children's literature. The book has been continuously in print since its first publication. The hardback edition is still published by Farrar, Straus & Giroux. The original blue dust jacket by Ellen Raskin was replaced with new art by Leo and Diane Dillon, with the publication of A Swiftly Tilting Planet in 1978. The book has also been published in a 25th anniversary collectors' edition (limited to 500 signed and numbered copies), at least two book club editions (one hardback, one Scholastic Book Services paperback), as a trade paperback under the Dell Yearling imprint, and as a mass market paperback under the Dell Laurel-Leaf imprint. The cover art on the paperback editions has changed several times since its first publication.

The book was reissued by Square Fish in trade and mass market paperback formats in May 2007, along with the rest of the Time Quintet. This new edition includes a previously unpublished interview with L'Engle as well as a transcription of her Newbery Medal acceptance speech.

Plot summary
One night, thirteen-year-old Meg Murry meets an eccentric new neighbor, Mrs Whatsit, who refers to something called a tesseract. Meg later finds out it is a scientific concept her father was working on before his mysterious disappearance. The following day, Meg, her child genius brother Charles, and fellow schoolmate Calvin visit Mrs Whatsit's home, where the equally strange Mrs Who and the voice of the unseen Mrs Which promise to help Meg find and rescue her father.

Mrs Whatsit, Mrs Who, and Mrs Which turn out to be supernatural beings who teleport Meg, Charles Wallace, and Calvin O'Keefe through the universe by means of a tesseract, a fifth-dimensional phenomenon explained as folding the fabric of space and time; this form of travel is called tessering. Their first stop is the planet Uriel, a world inhabited by centaur-like beings who live in a state of light and love, fighting against the approaching darkness. There, the Mrs Ws demonstrate to the children how the universe is under attack from an evil being that appears particularly clearly on Uriel as an overwhelming dark cloud, called The Black Thing. They then take the children to Orion's Belt to visit the Happy Medium, a far-seeing person with a crystal ball through which they are shown that Earth is partially covered by the darkness, although great religious figures, philosophers, scientists, and artists, have been fighting against it. Mrs Whatsit is revealed to be a former star, who exploded in an act of self-sacrifice to fight the darkness.

The three Mrs Ws tesser the children to the edge of the inhabited part of a dark planet named Camazotz, which has succumbed to The Black Thing, and where the Mrs Ws cannot themselves enter. Meg and Charles Wallace's father, Alex Murry, is imprisoned in a nearby city because he refused to yield to the group mind that causes inhabitants to behave in a mechanical way. When they reach the CENTRAL Central Intelligence building, Charles Wallace deliberately allows himself to be hypnotized, in order to find where their father is kept. Controlled by the group mind, Charles Wallace takes Meg and Calvin to the place where Meg's father is being held prisoner. He then takes them to IT, the disembodied brain with powerful telepathic abilities that controls the planet. Using special powers from Mrs Who's glasses, Meg is able to reach her father, who tessers Calvin, Meg, and himself to the adjacent planet Ixchel, before IT can control them all. Charles Wallace is left behind, still under the influence of IT, Meg is paralyzed from contact with The Black Thing during the trip, and Dr. Murry suffers broken ribs. The inhabitants of Ixchel are beast-like, with featureless faces, tentacles, and four arms. Despite their frightening appearance, they prove to be both wise and gentle; one cures Meg's paralysis, prompting Meg to nickname it “Aunt Beast”.

The trio of Mrs Whatsit, Mrs Who, and Mrs Which arrive on Ixchel, before Alex Murry has recovered, and assign the rescue of Charles Wallace to Meg alone. Arriving at the building where IT resides, she finds Charles Wallace still under IT's control. Inspired by hints from the Mrs Ws, Meg focuses all her love on Charles Wallace and is able to free him from IT, at which point Mrs Which remotely tessers Meg and Charles Wallace off Camazotz.

They all then tesser back to Earth, to the edge of the forest near the Murry home, and back to the moment in time just after the Mrs Ws and the children originally left Earth. Then the Mrs Ws vanish.

Characters

Main characters

Margaret "Meg" Murry

Meg is the oldest child of scientists Alex and Kate Murry, about thirteen years old. Introduced on the first page of the book, she is the story's main protagonist. One of Kate Murry's "abnormal" children, she seems to have a temper and a difficult time focusing in school.

Charles Wallace Murry

Charles Wallace is the youngest Murry child, at six years old. Charles Wallace speaks only to his family, but can empathically or telepathically read certain people's thoughts and feelings.

Calvin O'Keefe

Calvin is the third oldest of Paddy and Branwen O'Keefe's eleven children: a tall, thin, red-haired 14-year-old high school junior.

Supernatural characters

Mrs. Whatsit, Mrs. Who, and Mrs. Which 
The Mrs. Ws are immortal beings who can travel across large stretches of both space and time by dematerializing and rematerializing ("tessering"). They are all capable of shapeshifting, but appear as elderly women for almost all of the story.

Mrs. Whatsit is the youngest of the Mrs. Ws (despite being 2,379,152,497 years, 8 months, and 3 days old), and has the most interaction with the children. In a past life she was a star, and when reminded, still grieves for the loss of life on her former planets, when the star she was, died.

Mrs. Who communicates by quoting (and translating) literary sayings in Latin, Spanish, Italian, German, French, Portuguese, and Greek. When the Mrs. Ws leave the group on Camazotz, for no immediately obvious reason, Mrs. Who loans Meg her glasses.

Mrs. Which is the leader of the three women, the oldest of them, and the most skilled at tessering. However, she has nearly forgotten what a body is like, so has difficulty maintaining a solid form, and because of this does make a mistake while tessering to Camazotz. She is usually business-like and unemotional towards the children.

IT 

"IT" is the telepathic brain that controls the planet of Camazotz. IT appears as a giant-sized, disembodied human brain, housed in a transparent jar. While IT usually speaks through one of its pawns (such as the Man with Red Eyes) IT can speak directly to people via telepathy. IT is either an avatar or a servant of The Black Thing.

The Black Thing
The Black Thing, a formless, shadowy being, is the source of all evil in the universe.

Secondary characters

Dr. Alexander "Alex" Murry 
Alex Murry, the father of the Murry children, is a physicist who is researching tesseracts and their relation to the mysteries of the space / time continuum. At the start of the novel, he has been missing for some time.

Dr. Katherine "Kate" Murry
Katherine Murry, the mother of the Murry children, is a microbiologist. She is considered beautiful by the Murry children and others, having "flaming red hair", creamy skin, and violet eyes with long dark lashes.

Sandy and Dennys Murry

Sandy (named after his father Alexander, also goes by "Xan") and his twin brother Dennys ("Den") are the middle children in the Murry family, older than Charles Wallace but younger than Meg. They are 10 years old and are depicted as inseparable at the time of this book. They are the only "normal" and socially accepted children in the Murry family.

Mrs. Buncombe
Mrs. Buncombe is the wife of the constable in Meg's hometown.

Mr. Jenkins
Mr. Jenkins is Meg's high-school principal who implies that her family is in denial about Dr. Alex Murry's true whereabouts.

Supporting alien characters

Happy Medium 
The Happy Medium is human in appearance, but of uncertain gender. She uses her powers and a crystal ball to look at distant places and people. She prefers to look for happy events and her customary demeanor is jolly, but becomes sad upon viewing sad events. She lives in a cavern on a planet in Orion's Belt.

Aunt Beast 
Aunt Beast is a nurturing creature who cares after Meg on the planet Ixchel, the next planet out from Camazotz, nursing Meg back towards wholeness after exposure to The Black Thing. "Aunt Beast" is a name created by Meg that the character accepts; her actual name, if any, is not given. She is a human-sized, furry, four-armed, eyeless gray creature with telepathic abilities. Instead of fingers she has numerous long, waving tentacles.

Analysis

Religion 
The novel is highly spiritualized, with notable influences of divine intervention and prominent undertones of religious messages. According to James Beasley Simpson, the overwhelming love and desire for light within the novel is directly representative of a Christian love for God and Jesus Christ. Furthermore, the children encounter spiritual intervention, signaling God's presence in the ordinary, as well as the extendibility of God's power and love. Madeleine L'Engle's fantasy works are in part highly expressive of her Christian viewpoint in a manner somewhat similar to that of Christian fantasy writer C.S. Lewis.
L'Engle's liberal Christianity has been the target of criticism from conservative Christians, especially with respect to certain elements of A Wrinkle in Time.

L'Engle utilizes numerous religious references and allusions in the naming of locations within the novel. Camazotz is the name of a Mayan bat god, one of L'Engle's many mythological allusions in her nomenclature.
The name Ixchel refers to a Mayan jaguar goddess of medicine. Uriel is a planet with extremely tall mountains, an allusion to the Archangel Uriel. It is inhabited by creatures that resemble winged centaurs. It is "the third planet of the star Malak (meaning 'angel' in Hebrew) in the spiral galaxy Messier 101", which would place it at roughly 21 million light-years from Earth. The site of Mrs Whatsit's temporary transformation into one of these winged creatures, it is the place where "the guardian angels show the questers a vision of the universe that is obscured on earth." The three women are described as ancient beings who act as guardian angels.

The theme of picturing the fight of good against evil as a battle of light and darkness is a recurring one. Its manner is reminiscent of the prologue to the Gospel of John, which is quoted within the book. When the Mrs Ws reveal their secret roles in the cosmic fight against darkness, they ask the children to name some figures on Earth, a partially dark planet, who fight the darkness. They name Jesus and, later in the discussion, the Buddha is named as well.

Nevertheless, religious journalist Sarah Pulliam Bailey doubts whether the novel contains religious undertones. Bailey explains that many readers somehow believe the novel promotes witchcraft, as opposed to alluding to Christian spirituality. Bailey states that conservative Christians take offense, due to the novel's potential relativistic qualities, suggesting the various interpretations of religious allusions signals anti-Christian sentiments. However, in her personal journal referencing A Wrinkle in Time, L'Engle confirms the religious content within the novel: "If I've ever written a book that says what I feel about God and the universe, this is it."

Conformity 
Themes of conformity and yielding to the status quo are prominent in the novel:

IT is a powerful dominant group that manipulates the planet of Camazotz into conformity. Even Charles Wallace falls prey and is hence persuaded to conform. It is thanks to Meg that she and her father and brother are able to break from conformity.

According to Charlotte Jones Voiklis, the author's granddaughter, the story was not a simple allegory of communism; in a three-page passage that was cut before publication, the process of domination and conformity is said to be an outcome of dictatorship under totalitarian regimes, and of an intemperate desire for security in democratic countries.

J. Fulton writes:

Conformity on Camazotz 
Camazotz is a planet of extreme, enforced conformity, ruled by a disembodied brain called IT. Camazotz is similar to Earth, with familiar trees such as birches, pines, and maples, an ordinary hill on which the children arrive, and a town with smokestacks, which "might have been one of any number of familiar towns". The horror of the place arises from its ordinary appearance, endlessly duplicated. The houses are "all exactly alike, small square boxes painted gray", which, according to author Donald Hettinga, signals a comparison to "the burgeoning American suburbia", such as the post-war housing developments of Levittown, Pennsylvania. The people who live in the houses are similarly described as "mother figures" who "all gave the appearance of being the same".

W. Blackburn compared Camazotz to "an early sixties American image of life in a communist state", which Blackburn later dismissed.

Feminism 
A Wrinkle in Time has also received praise for empowering young female readers. Critics have celebrated L'Engle's depiction of Meg Murry, a young, precocious heroine whose curiosity and intellect help save the world from evil. The New York Times has described this portrayal as "a departure from the typical 'girls' book' protagonist – as wonderful as many of those varied characters are".

In doing so, L'Engle has been credited for paving the way for other bright heroines, including Hermione Granger of the Harry Potter book series, as well as Katniss Everdeen of the Hunger Games trilogy. Regarding her choice to include a female protagonist, L'Engle has stated in her acceptance speech upon receiving the Margaret Edwards Award, "I'm a female. Why would I give all the best ideas to a male?"

Reception
At the time of the book's publication, Kirkus Reviews said:

According to The Horn Book Magazine:

In a retrospective essay about the Newbery Medal-winning books from 1956 to 1965, librarian Carolyn Horovitz wrote:

In a 2011 essay for Tor.com, American author and critic Mari Ness called A Wrinkle in Time

A 2004 study found that A Wrinkle in Time was a common read-aloud book for sixth-graders in schools in San Diego County, California. Based on a 2007 online poll, the National Education Association listed the book as one of its "Teachers' top 100 books for children." It was one of the "Top 100 chapter books" of all time in a 2012 poll by School Library Journal.

In 2016, the novel saw a spike in sales after Chelsea Clinton mentioned it as influential in her childhood in a speech at the 2016 Democratic National Convention.

Controversy 
A Wrinkle in Time is on the American Library Association list of the 100 most frequently challenged books of 1990–2000 at number 23. The novel has been accused of being both anti-religious and anti-Christian for its inclusion of witches and crystal balls, and for containing "New Age" spiritual themes that do not reflect traditional Christian teachings.

According to USA Today, the novel was challenged in a school district in the state of Alabama due to the "book's listing the name of Jesus Christ together with the names of great artists, philosophers, scientists, and religious leaders when referring to those who defend Earth against evil." The novel was also challenged in 1984 by an elementary school in Polk City, Florida when parents claimed that the novel promoted witchcraft.

Regarding this controversy, L'Engle told The New York Times:

Adaptations

Audio books 
In 1994, Listening Library released an unabridged, 4 cassette audio edition read by the author.

On January 10, 2012, Audible released a 50th anniversary edition recorded by Hope Davis.

Film adaptations 

In 2003, a television adaptation of the novel was made by a collaboration of Canadian production companies, to be distributed in the United States by Disney. The movie was directed by John Kent Harrison, with a teleplay by Susan Shilliday. It stars Katie Stuart as Meg Murry, Alfre Woodard as Mrs. Whatsit, Alison Elliott as Mrs. Who, and Kate Nelligan as Mrs. Which. In an interview with MSNBC / Newsweek, when L'Engle was asked if the film "met her expectations", she said, "I have glimpsed it ... I expected it to be bad, and it is."

A theatrical feature film adaptation of the novel, by Walt Disney Pictures, was released in 2018. The film was directed by Ava DuVernay and written by Jennifer Lee and Jeff Stockwell. It stars Oprah Winfrey, Reese Witherspoon, Mindy Kaling, Chris Pine, Gugu Mbatha-Raw, Storm Reid, Michael Peña, and Zach Galifianakis.

Plays 
An adaptation by James Sie premiered at the Lifeline Theatre in Chicago in 1990, and returned to the stage in 1998 and 2017.

John Glore adapted the novel as a play that premiered in 2010. It was written for 6 actors playing 12 parts. One actor plays Mrs Whatsit, the Man with Red Eyes, and Camazotz Man. Similarly, another performer plays the characters of Dr. Kate Murry, Mrs Who, Camazotz Woman, and Aunt Beast. The stage adaptation premiered in Costa Mesa, California, with productions in Bethesda, Maryland; Cincinnati; Philadelphia; Orlando; Portland, Oregon; and other cities.

An adaptation by Tracy Young premiered at the Oregon Shakespeare Festival in April 2014, with productions at colleges and theaters around the U.S.

Opera
In 1992, OperaDelaware (known for frequently adapting children's books) staged an opera based on A Wrinkle in Time written by Libby Larsen with a libretto by Walter Green. The review in Philly.com stated: "The composer does not place arias and set pieces, but conversational ensembles with spoken dialogue that made the young daughter's climactic but concise song about familial love all the more imposing."

Graphic novel 
In 2010, Hope Larson announced that she was writing and illustrating the official graphic novel version of the book. This version was published by Farrar, Straus & Giroux in October 2012.

Further reading

See also

 Tunnel Through Time
 Wormhole

Notes

References

External links
 
 
 
 
 

1962 American novels
Time Quintet
American fantasy novels adapted into films
Novels by Madeleine L'Engle
Newbery Medal–winning works
Science fantasy novels
Young adult fantasy novels
Children's fantasy novels
Children's science fiction novels
Christian science fiction
Feminist science fiction novels
Space exploration novels
1962 science fiction novels
1962 fantasy novels
Books with cover art by Leo and Diane Dillon
Farrar, Straus and Giroux books
Fiction about wormholes
Novels set on fictional planets
Novels about time travel
1962 children's books
American novels adapted into television shows
Science fiction novels adapted into films
American novels adapted into plays
Novels adapted into operas
Novels adapted into comics